Bari Brahmana is a town and a notified area committee, just 25 km from Samba town in Samba district  in the union territory of Jammu and Kashmir, India. The Industrial town has become the largest manufacturing centre of Jammu and Kashmir. Bari Brahmana has the largest number of industries in the state with a great share in industrial GDP of state. The name of the town is derived from two Dogri words 'Bari' meaning open ground and 'Brahmana' meaning Brahmins (a Varna in Hinduism). Thus the name means 'the garden of Brahmins.'

Geography
It has an average elevation of 340 metres (1115 feet). The city is just south of Jammu Tawi city and is situated on the banks of Devika river at a flat alluvial plains on the foot hills of the Shiwaliks which surround it on the East and North-east.

Climate 
The climate of the district being sub tropical zone is hot and dry in summer and cold in winter. The foothills of the mountains are bit cooler than neighbouring areas of Punjab. The temperature ranges between 4 degree Celsius and 47 degree Celsius.

History 
Bari Brahmana was formerly a small settlement of the Dogra Brahmins who were mostly teachers and astrologers. With the development of Jammu's infrastructure and its proximity to Jammu city, Bari Brahmana emerged as a leading manufacturing centre of the state.

Demographics 
 India census, Bari Brahmana had a population of 105,453. Males constitute 54% of the population and females 46%. The majority of population is Muslim followed by Hindus and Christians.

References

Cities and towns in Samba district